The Kansas City Times was a morning newspaper in Kansas City, Missouri, published from 1867 to 1990. The morning Kansas City Times, under ownership of the afternoon Kansas City Star, won two Pulitzer Prizes and was bigger than its parent when its name was changed to The Star.

History
John C. Moore and John Newman Edwards founded The Times in 1867 to support the Democratic Party's anti-Reconstruction policies. Edwards had been adjutant of Confederate general Joseph O. Shelby's division during the American Civil War. Moore was a colonel under Shelby, and before that chief of staff to General John S. Marmaduke, judge adjutant general, and second in the Marmaduke-Walker duel.

William Rockhill Nelson bought The Times on October 19, 1901, mainly because he wanted The Times''' Associated Press wire. Nelson applied a subheading to the newspaper The Morning Kansas City Star and declared that The Kansas City Star empire was a 24-hour-a-day newspaper. In accordance with Nelson's will, employees took over the newspaper in 1926 upon the death of Nelson's daughter.

The Star and Times were locally owned by employees until 1977, when they were sold to Capital Cities. Under corporate ownership, The Times had higher circulation than its evening sister paper. Capital Cities made attempts to make the newsrooms appear to compete (though Kansas City did not have competing dailies after The Kansas City Journal folded in 1942). The Times won its only Pulitzer Prizes in 1982. Rick Atkinson won an award for "National Reporting", and The Times shared an award with The Star for "Local General or Spot New Reporting" for its coverage of the Hyatt Regency walkway collapse.

On March 1, 1990, The Star (then under ownership of Capital Cities/ABC) applied its name to the morning paper and The Times'' name disappeared, meaning that Kansas City no longer had an afternoon daily.

References

External links

 PBS American Experience Article on John Newman Edwards

Kansas City Times
Defunct newspapers published in Missouri
Newspapers established in 1867
1867 establishments in Missouri
1990 disestablishments in Missouri
Pulitzer Prize-winning newspapers